Payena acuminata is a tree in the family Sapotaceae. The bark is brown. Inflorescences bear up to 20 flowers. The specific epithet  is from the Latin meaning "tapering to a narrow point", referring to the leaf apex. The timber is used commercially and the tree is also a source of gutta-percha. Habitat is mixed dipterocarp forests from sea-level to  altitude. P. acuminata is found widely in Thailand, Malaysia and Indonesia.

References

acuminata
Trees of Thailand
Trees of Malesia
Plants described in 1826